Marathas under Raghunath Rao and Malhar Rao Holkar laid siege on the forts of Barwara and Tonk in the April 1757. The forts were successfully defended by Sawai Madho Singh of Kingdom of Jaipur. Combined forces of Raghunath Rao and Malhar Rao Holkar were defeated.

Background
When Ahmed Shah Durrani's scare was looming large over the Indian horizon, Peshwa Raghunath Rao reached Rajputana along with Vithal Shivadev Vinchurkar and a strong contingent of Malhar Rao Holkar. The Peshwa was then joined by his half brother Shamsher Bahadur and Antaji Mankeshwar with their contingents. This stronghold wanted to get pending payments of chauth from small kingdoms in Rajputana and then reach to abdali as early as possible. While pressing Sawai Madho Singh for payment, he laid siege on the fort of Barwara belonging to Rajawat clan of Kachhwaha Rajputs, in April 1757. 

In the meantime Ahmad Shah had come and gone without Raghunath's lifting a finger to defend the holy places of Hindustan or to prevent the foreign invader from carrying away the treasures of the land or leaving sacked dry for the Marathas, who would come after him. When Abdali had invaded India, Raghunath Rao instead of fighting him, assumed a despondent tone from the outset and wrote a letter to on 16 February 1757:
Our troops are not yet assembled, We have no money. Abdali is strong. It requires very great resources to chastise him. Send Dattaji Schindia quickly to me from the Dakkan.

On 16 February 1757, his Diwan Sakha Ram Bapu writes:
Month of Phalgun will be over before my contingent and that of Malhar are mustered. Abdali is a powerful enemy.

Instead of making efforts to win Sawai Madho Singh's support to fight Ahmad Shah Durrani, Raghunath Rao and Malhar Rao Holkar laid sieges on his forts. The Jaipur minister Kanni Ram offered to buy Raghunath Rao off by paying the same pending tribute as agreed upon in the past, Raghunath Rao rejected the offer demanding more money even as a loan. As quoted by Sir Jadunath Sarkar in his book Fall of the Mughal Empire Vol II:

″Raghunath would not listen to it. He demanded 40 to 50 lakhs of rupees in cash and the cession or the Jagir worth 14 lakhs given by the Emperor to Jaipur, some years ago, appertaining to fort Ranthambhore, in addition to Rampura, Bhanpura, Tonk, Toda and Hinglaz-garh. He was determined either to secure these gains by consent or to remain here for 4 months and gain territory worth 40 to 50 lakhs by war″.

″Madho Singh wisely rejected those exorbitant terms and put his capital and other forts in a vigilant and active state of defence. The total Maratha force in the region including Maratha contingents now numbered 13,000. But Jaipur fort had a garrison of 17,000 and the Raja's generals patrolled its strength day and night. Sanganer was held by Dalel Singh Rajawat who was strengthened (10th. May) with six tumbrels of powder and shot. Madho Singh called his feudatories one by one and made them swear on the sacred leaf of 'Beel Patra' to resist the southern invaders to death. His determination to fight rather than accept Raghunath's humiliating terms became manifest to all″.

Battle
To prove their supremacy in India, they first laid siege on the fort of Barwara, and in the same year laid siege on the fort of Tonk which is very close to Barwara. Barwara could easily be defended and the Maratha attack was repulsed. The Marathas tightly besieged Tonk fort and attacked its battlements, but failed to capature the fort due to strong Rajput garrison. The strong Rajput garrison made it impossible for the Marathas to capture the fort. The sorties that the Rajputs made, were irresitble for the Marathas. The Rajputs destroyed thousands of Marathas cutting them into pieces.
The strong attitude of Sawai Madho Singh forced the Marathas lose more than a month and feed his large army in idleness in Jaipur territory. At last Raghunath Rao wrote to the Peshwa on 12 July 1757 in support for his prayer for remittance:

I have no money, nor is any loan available, my troops are in debt, prices here are very high. I am daily getting my food only by sacking the villages.

The sieges of these forts of Barwara and Tonk by the Marathas were a complete failure as Marathas could gain absolutely nothing out of it and were forced by the Rajputs of Jaipur to retreat.

Result
The Rajputs of Jaipur under Sawai Madho Singh defeated the Marathas under Peshwa Raghunath Rao, Shamsher Bahadur and Malhar Rao Holkar. The sieges of Barwara fort and Tonk fort proved to be futile for the Marathas.
Marathas were forced by the Rajputs to give up the siege. Finally, after waiting  for a few days for the arrival of Malhar Rao Holkar's wife Gautama Bai to join them, Raghunath Rao and Malhar Rao Holkar left Rajputana by the end of July 1757.

About fort of Barwara
Fort of Barwara was built by the Rathores of Roatla sub-clan. The ruler of the fort Ram Singh Roatla sided with Dara Shikoh against Aurangzeb for the succession of Mughal throne. He hurled his lance upon Aurangzeb in the battle with such force, it was admired by the enemy faction too. He died fighting the battle and also his son Shiva Singh Roatla was killed by Sawai Jai Singh of Jaipur. This led to annexation of Barwara by Jaipur and remained in Jaipur hands forever.
Barwara fort was later conferred by Sawai Jai Singh upon Rao Bahadur Ratan Singh, son of Rao Bahadur Fateh Singh of Sarsoup, for the services of Fateh Singh who died fighting in the Battle of Kushasthal Pancholas.

About fort of Tonk
On the bank of river Banas, lies the city of Tonk. Here lies the strong fort of Bhoamgarh as the citadel of the city and its district.

References

1757 in India
Barwara and Tonk

History of Rajasthan
History of India
Tonk district
Barwara and Tonk